FC Adeli Batumi is a Georgian football club.

Current squad

Past internationals
 Anupam Sarkar (2015)

References

External links
FC Adeli Batumi at Global Sports Archive
FC Adeli Batumi at FootballDatabase

Football clubs in Georgia (country)